Rhoda Levine is an opera director, choreographer, and a faculty member at several schools of music.

Levine was born in New York, NY. She wrote the libretto for Opus Number Zoo by Luciano Berio and has also written children's books. She is the artistic director of Play It By Ear, an improvisational opera group. She is the recipient of the National Institute for Music Theater Award. She got her BA at Bard College.

In the summer, she teaches at the John Duffy Composers Institute, in Norfolk, VA.

Operas directed by Rhoda Levine

Further 
Productions at Belgium's Opéra National; Scottish Opera; San Francisco Opera; Festival of the Two Worlds; Cabrillo Festival; and Holland Festival; directed and choreographed productions on and off-Broadway, in London's West End, and for CBS and WNET.

Faculty 

Former faculty member at the Curtis Institute of Music, Yale School of Drama, The Juilliard School, and Northwestern University, and currently teaches at Manhattan School of Music (since 1992) and Mannes College and is a frequent guest teacher/visiting artist at Tisch School of the Arts at NYU.

Personal life 
Levine lives in New York City.

Books 
 
 
 
 
 Republished by the New York Review of Books in June 2010.

References

External links 
 Rhoda Levine papers, 1952–2009, Music Division, New York Public Library for the Performing Arts

American opera directors
Female opera directors
American choreographers
Year of birth missing (living people)
Living people
Bard College alumni
Curtis Institute of Music faculty
Yale University faculty
Juilliard School faculty
Northwestern University faculty
Manhattan School of Music faculty
Mannes College The New School for Music faculty
Tisch School of the Arts faculty
Artists from New York City